The Sterling Hill Mine, now known as the Sterling Hill Mine Tour & Museum of Fluorescence, is a former iron and zinc mine in Ogdensburg, Sussex County, New Jersey, United States.  It was the last working underground mine in New Jersey when it closed in 1986, and it became a museum in 1989.  Along with the nearby Franklin Mine, it is known for its variety of minerals, especially the fluorescent varieties.  It was added to the National Register of Historic Places in 1991.

History

Mining began at the site in the 1630s, when it was mistakenly thought to be a copper deposit. George III of the United Kingdom granted the property to  William Alexander, titled Lord Stirling.  Stirling sold it to Robert Ogden in 1765. It went through several owners until the various mines were combined into the New Jersey Zinc Company in 1897.  The mine closed in 1986 due to a tax dispute with the town, which foreclosed for back taxes in 1989 and auctioned the property to Richard and Robert Hauck for $750,000.  It opened as a museum in August 1990.

Geology

The ore bodies at the Sterling Hill mine lie within a formation called the Reading Prong massif; the ores are contained within the Franklin Marble.  This was deposited as limestone in a Precambrian oceanic rift trough.  It subsequently underwent extensive metamorphosis during the Grenville orogeny, approximately 1.15 billion years ago. Uplift and erosion during the late Mesozoic and the Tertiary exposed the ore bodies at the surface; the glaciers of the Pleistocene strewed trains of ore-bearing boulders for miles to the south, in places creating deposits large enough to be worked profitably.

In the area of the Franklin and Sterling Hill mines, 357 types of minerals are known to occur; these make up approximately 10% of the minerals known to science.  Thirty-five of these minerals have not been found anywhere else.  Ninety-one of the minerals fluoresce.

As of 2017, other than the very top level of the mine (<100 ft), the entire lower section has been flooded due to underground water table and hence no longer accessible. The mine remains at  constantly.

Museum
The  tour spends about 30 minutes inside the Exhibit hall which contains a wide variety of mining memorabilia, mineralogical samples, fossils, and meteorites.   It then leads into the mine for a  walk on level ground through the underground mine. The walk goes through a new  section called the Rainbow tunnel which they blasted in 1990 using 49 blasts and at a cost of $2 a foot. In the Rainbow room, short wave UV lights are turned on to demonstrate the entire tunnel and various samples glowing with fluorescence.

The mine is also home to the Ellis Astronomical Observatory, the Thomas S. Warren Museum of Fluorescence, and a collection of mining equipment.

The museum periodically arranges public mineral collecting sessions as well as more private and behind the scene events for local geology clubs.

See also 
 National Register of Historic Places listings in Sussex County, New Jersey
 Backwards Tunnel, located nearby the mine and also on the National Register of Historic Places.
 Ogden Mine Railroad

References

Literature 
 Robert W. Jones, Nature's hidden rainbows, Ultra-Violet Products, Inc., San Gabriel Calif., 120 pp., 1964, (pdf 34MB).

External links
Sterling Hill Mining Museum official website
Mindat.org entry for Sterling Hill
Sterling Hill ore and rock samples, photo gallery

Geology of New Jersey
Underground mines in the United States
Mining museums in New Jersey
Industry museums in New Jersey
Museums in Sussex County, New Jersey
Geology museums in New Jersey
Mines in New Jersey
National Register of Historic Places in Sussex County, New Jersey
Ogdensburg, New Jersey
New Jersey Register of Historic Places
Museums established in 1989
1989 establishments in New Jersey